Archie Roberts may refer to:

 Archie Roberts (Australian footballer) (1910–1945), Australian rules footballer 
 Archie Roberts (American football) (born 1942), cardiac surgeon and American football player